In college football, 2015 NCAA football bowl games may refer to:

2014–15 NCAA football bowl games, for games played in January 2015 as part of the 2014 season
2015–16 NCAA football bowl games, for games played in December 2015 as part of the 2015 season